The 1976–77 season was the second occasion on which Tennis Borussia Berlin played in the Bundesliga, the highest tier of the German football league system. After 34 league games, Tennis Borussia ended up in 17th position as they had done two seasons previously. Second from the bottom of the table, they only finished one place above Rot-Weiss Essen due to a better goal difference. As in the previous season, the club reached the third round of the DFB-Pokal; this time losing 5–1 away to the season's eventual cup winners 1. FC Köln. Swedish striker Benny Wendt scored 20 of the club's 47 league goals.

1976–77 Tennis Borussia Berlin squad

1976–77 fixtures

Player statistics

Final league position – 17th

References

External links 
 1976–77 Tennis Borussia Berlin season – squad and statistics at fussballdaten.de 

Tennis Borussia Berlin seasons
German football clubs 1976–77 season